Royal Air Force Carew Cheriton or more simply RAF Carew Cheriton is a former Royal Air Force station of Coastal and Training Command near Carew, Pembrokeshire. It was built on the site of RNAS Pembroke (aka RNAS Milton) from the First World War, which had been decommissioned and sold off in the inter war years.

History

First World War
Royal Naval Air Station Pembroke or Milton as it was known then opened in August 1915.  The base operated SS-class (Submarine Scout or Sea Scout), SSZ-class (Sea Scout Zero) and C-class (Coastal-class or 'Coastals') non-rigid airships which operated over the Irish Sea, Bristol Channel and Western Approaches on anti-submarine patrols.  In April 1917 the base began operating Sopwith 1½ Strutter and Airco D.H.6 biplanes.
 
Upon the formation of the Royal Air Force (RAF) on 1 April 1918, the Royal Naval Air Service (RNAS) ceased to exist. The location acquired the dual designation of RAF Pembroke and Royal Naval Airship Station Pembroke. Use of the designation "RN Airship Station" was entirely valid, because the airships remained the property of the Admiralty, never being transferred to the Air Ministry.
 
RAF Pembroke was part of No.14 Group, RAF, successor to the RNAS "Milford Haven Anti-Submarine Group". No.14 Group included No. 255 Squadron RAF. The entire site closed in March 1920.

Second World War
Carew Cheriton was recommissioned in 1938, initially with grass runways. From the early 1940s there were three concrete runways, making the station a Class A airfield.  The airfield was used as a support station for the flying boat operations at RAF Pembroke Dock.  Operational flying ceased in 1942.  On 15 April 1941 12 airmen were killed in a Luftwaffe air raid which hit the station's sickbay.  In 1942 the station became No. 10 Radio School, a training camp for aircrew wireless operators.  RAF Carew Cheriton closed in 1945.

Squadrons

Units

Postwar
The base was used as an emergency landing site on two occasions after its closure.  A de Havilland Vampire FB.5 from Anglesey made a successful emergency landing on the old runway after experiencing mechanical problems. A Bristol Beaufighter in a separate incident also attempted an emergency landing but sadly crashed short of the runway with no survivors.

In 2019 a memorial was unveiled to those of the 5,000 soldiers in the US Army's 110th Infantry Regiment, stationed in Pembrokeshire from 1943 to 1944, who died during the liberation of Europe.

Current use

The site is no longer used as an airfield though much remains including the runway and the Second World War control tower (adjacent to the Carew Cheriton Showground) has been restored by the Carew Cheriton Control Tower Group, and turned into a museum which is open to the public.  The airfield is also used for various events and activities including car boot sales, auctions and part of the airfield has been converted for use as a go-cart track.

References

Citations

Bibliography

External links

BBC article
The control tower restoration project
Historic Landscape Characterisation

Royal Air Force stations in Wales
Royal Naval Air Stations in Wales
Buildings and structures in Pembrokeshire